Se upp för Jönssonligan is a 2020 Swedish comedy film, directed by Tomas Alfredson. It is the fifteenth installment in the Jönssonligan franchise, and a reboot of the series. As the second reboot of the series, the creative team went back to pure comedy, after the heist thriller comedy in Jönssonligan – Den perfekta stöten failed to live up to the expectations.

Cast
 Henrik Dorsin as Charles-Ingvar Jönsson
 Anders "Ankan" Johansson as Ragnar Vanheden
 David Sundin as Dynamit Harry
 Hedda Stiernstedt as Doris
 Reine Brynolfsson as Televinken
 Marie Göranzon as Margit Vanheden
 Lennart Hjulström as Gösta Vanheden
 Lena Olin as Anita
 Sven Ahlström as Poppe
 MyAnna Buring as Regina Wall
 Ville Virtanen as Kantor Veikko Kusela
 Pekka Strang as Henrik Adlerstierna

Production
By July 2018, the main three characters were cast with comedians Henrik Dorsin as Charles-Ingvar Jönsson, Anders "Ankan" Johansson as Ragnar Vanheden and David Sundin as Dynamit Harry. That same month a casting call for actors ages 7 to 10 went out for the film.

The filming began in Norrköping in July 2018 and finished in August.

Release
The film was originally set to be released in late 2019, but was moved to 2020.

References

Further reading

External links

2020 films
2020 comedy films
Jönssonligan films
Swedish comedy films
2020s Swedish-language films